Admir Jamak (born 2 October 1970) is a Yugoslav biathlete. He competed in the men's 20 km individual event at the 1992 Winter Olympics.

References

External links
 

1970 births
Living people
Yugoslav male biathletes
Olympic biathletes of Yugoslavia
Biathletes at the 1992 Winter Olympics
Place of birth missing (living people)